Okonin may refer to the following places:
Okonin, Grudziądz County in Kuyavian-Pomeranian Voivodeship (north-central Poland)
Okonin, Rypin County in Kuyavian-Pomeranian Voivodeship (north-central Poland)
Okonin, Subcarpathian Voivodeship (south-east Poland)